Schaut auf diese Stadt (Look at This City) It is an East German movie directed by Karl Gass in 1962. It's a subtle propaganda film in which peaceful East Germany depicts West Germany as the forefront to neo-fascism, terrorism, and neo-colonialism. East Germany requires an "anti-fascist defense" against the West Germans. It depicts the city of Berlin following the end of World War II and the struggle between the split between democracy and communism. The film uses authentic footage from newsreels and images from both sides to convey the justification of the resurrection of the Berlin Wall on 13 August 1961.

Plot
 This documentary film takes footage from West Berlin and East Berlin as they try to rebuild their city following the devastation of World War II. The film begins by noting that "This film was made in order for peace." Karl Gass was contracted to create the film by the German Democratic Republic (GDR). The GDR was a state in the Eastern Bloc during the Cold War. The film states that a city street can tell a story. Many street names in West Berlin are named after Americans who freed Germany from fascism. One example of this was Lucius D. Clay who pushed communism to the Eastern borders.

The film focuses on the reconstruction of Berlin following World War II. The first order of business was putting the people back to work. Berlin held their first elections in 1946 which created an administration that would implement laws. Government officials in Western Berlin were against the socialization of Berlin and effectively split the city of Berlin into East and West. However, because of the signing of the Potsdam Agreement, the Soviets had control of Berlin. Therefore, this became a global issue because the USSR and United States of America were trying to implement their spheres of influence on nations.

The main point of the film was that Germany was tired of bloodshed. If the Berlin Wall could keep the nation from more death, they would be satisfied. Germany was trying to become the strongest military from the beginning of World War I, 1914, until the end of World War II, 1945, and it had taken a toll on the nation. East Germany was content with being a part of the Eastern world as long as war would end.

Historical context
Following World War II, another war started. Two nations became the frontrunners for world power: the US and the USSR. This created a power struggle between who would have the most influence for capitalism or socialism. Berlin was in the crossfire between capitalist and socialist influence, and it ended up splitting the city between East and West. Winston Churchill said that there was a metal curtain between the Eastern and Western hemisphere, and Berlin actually had a curtain, the Berlin Wall. Until its destruction in 1989, the city of Berlin was physically divided with little to no contact from the other side. This proves the influence that the US and USSR had on the world.

Cast
 Karl Gass
 Werner Hoehne
 Eberhard Mellies
 Georg Thies

References

External links
 

East German films
1960s German-language films
German documentary films
Documentary films about Berlin
1960s German films